This is a list of lighthouses in Mauritius.

Lighthouses

In 1995, the lighthouses of  Mauritius were commemorated in 4 stamps.

See also
 Lists of lighthouses and lightvessels

References

External links

Mauritius
Lighthouses
Lighthouses